Edward Shaw Hose,  (25 November 1871 – 12 September 1946) was a colonial administrator. He served  his civil service career in Federated Malay States and Straits Settlements and was the British Resident of Negri Sembilan and Colonial Secretary of Straits Settlements.

Career
E S Hose joined the Malayan Civil Service as a junior officer in Perak in 1891.
He served five months in 1904 as Magistrate in Singapore.
Between 1904 and 1921, he was in charge of many Federal departments in Food, Labour and Agriculture.
In 1919, he was the District Officer of Lower Perak and Director of Food Production (Kuala Lumpur).
In 1921, he was appointed as the British Resident of Negri Sembilan.
In 1924, he was appointed as the Colonial Secretary of Straits Settlements to succeed Sir Frederick Seton James whom became the Governor of the Windward Islands.

Personal life
E S Hose was born on 25 November 1871 to the Right Rev. George Frederick Hose, who was the Bishop of Singapore from 1881 to 1908. E S Hose died on 12 September 1946 at his home near Guildford.

Awards and honour
E S Hose was invested with Companion of the Most Distinguished Order of St. Michael and St. George (CMG) during the 1924 New Year Honours.

References

1871 births
1946 deaths
Chief Secretaries of Singapore
Administrators in British Singapore
Companions of the Order of St Michael and St George